The DeWint House, in Tappan, New York, is one of the oldest surviving structures in Rockland County and is an outstanding example of Hudson Valley Dutch Colonial architecture. It was built using brick and indigenous stone in 1700 by Daniel DeClark, a Hollander, who emigrated to America in 1676 and bought the land from the native inhabitants in 1682.  The date of construction is marked by glazed bricks incorporated into the façade.

In 1746, West Indies planter and American patriot Johannes DeWint and his spouse Antje Dewint bought the house. His daughter, Anna Maria, and her husband, Major Fredericus Blauvelt, lived in the house.

The DeWint House became a temporary headquarters of George Washington while he was Commander-in-Chief during the American Revolution. Washington was a guest in the south parlor twice in 1780 and twice in 1783.  The "Washington Room" in the DeWint House is a National Masonic Historic Site.

Washington's headquarters

Washington first stayed at the Dewint House from August 8–24, 1780, while inspecting a redoubt on the Hudson River.

Washington returned from September 28 to October 7, 1780, for the nearby trial of British spy Major John André. Washington signed the execution warrant in the house and Andre was subsequently hanged. Andre had been captured in Tarrytown after plotting with Benedict Arnold to surrender West Point to the British.  André was held in the Old '76 House in Tappan, a tavern which is now a restaurant.  Washington provided meals from his table at the DeWint House to André at the '76 House.  A stone on André Hill Road at Gallows Hill marks the site of André's hanging.

Washington and his key staff headquartered at the DeWint House from May 4–8, 1783, while negotiating the final withdrawal of British troops from New York City with British General Sir Guy Carleton. It was said to have been a friendly conference combined with an elegant dinner prepared by Samuel Fraunces, owner of Fraunces Tavern in New York City, who came up to prepare the dinner for Washington and his guest.

From November 11–14, 1783, a terrible snowstorm forced Washington to seek shelter in the DeWint House on his trip to visit West Point and later New York City, where he tendered his resignation.

Grounds and renovation

The property was in disrepair when it was acquired by the Grand Lodge of Free and Accepted Masons of the State of New York in 1932. The site was declared a National Historic Landmark and was added to the National Register of Historic Places in 1966. The DeWint House, along with Stony Point Battlefield in Stony Point and the Blauvelt House in New City, are the only places in Rockland County designated as New York State Paths through History sites.

The site has undergone extensive restoration and upgrading. The house's two first-floor rooms have been restored and furnished to reflect the period of Washington's occupancy. A fully functioning replica kitchen, as Washington might have known it while he was a guest of the DeWints, was completed in 1996.

The grounds include a 19th-century carriage house that contains displays of artifacts uncovered at the site during archaeological digs, as wells as items related to Washington, André and Arnold, and the Masons. A large mill stone from a grist mill in nearby Ramapo is displayed on the grounds, and at the rear of the house stand seven small grave markers each bearing one to three initials, which came from a nearby property. It is believed these markers came from a burial ground for slaves on that property.

The house and grounds are open to the public.

References

External links

Revolutionaryday.com
Co.rockland.ny.us
Hudsonrivervalley.com
Nynjctbotany.org
Travelhudsonvalley.org
Fortklock.com
Paths through History designation

Houses on the National Register of Historic Places in New York (state)
National Historic Landmarks in New York (state)
Houses completed in 1700
Museums in Rockland County, New York
Historic house museums in New York (state)
Biographical museums in New York (state)
Houses in Rockland County, New York
American Revolutionary War museums in New York (state)
Historic American Buildings Survey in New York (state)
National Register of Historic Places in Rockland County, New York
1700 establishments in the Province of New York